Just a Rolling Stone is the debut studio album by American singer Donnie Klang. It was released by Bad Boy Records and Atlantic Records on September 2, 2008 in Canada and the United States. After winning the reality singing contest Making the Band 4 in 2007, Klang was offered a solo contract by Bad Boy head and MtB man of the house Sean Combs instead of a spot in the all-male R&B group Day26. Combs consulted a variety of writers and producers to work with Klang on his debut, including The-Dream and Soul Diggaz as well as Channel 7, Mario Winans, and Tricky Stewart.

Just a Rolling Stone garnered mixed to negative reviews from music critics, many of whom found the material too outdated and compared Klang unfavorably with Justin Timberlake. The album debuted and peaked at number 19 on the Billboard 200 and entered the top five on the US Top R&B/Hip-Hop Albums. It spawned a sole single "Take You There", which was released on March 23, 2008 and peaked at number 83 on the Billboard Pop 100 chart. The album remains Klang's only album with Bad Boy after leaving the label in 2010.

Critical reception

Jon Caramanica, writing for The New York Times, remarked that on Just a Rolling Stone, Klang "hews closely to a current template for white-soul success: the recent work of Justin Timberlake, an airy-voiced former boy band star, with Timbaland, an eccentric visionary [...] He's a pleasant, if not altogether emphatic, singer. At times he sounds as if he were laying down the demo vocals for someone else to sing on top of – meaning that these songs, many of them great, seem to shape him, not the other way around." Similarly, Allmusic editor Matt Collar found that Just a Rolling Stone "positions Klang as a kind of lesser Justin Timberlake or less amusing Robin Thicke. In any case, the results on Just a Rolling Stone are less interesting than either of those aforementioned R&B crooners and more along the lines of a Color Me Badd-reboot. Which is to say, Klang's music is oddly outdated." PopMatters critic McGuire felt that "Mr. Combs' imprint certainly doesn't save Klang's debut enough to make it worth listening to. Yeah, his stone may be rolling. It just appears it’s going in the wrong direction."

Chart performance
The album peaked at number 19 on the US Billboard 200 and dropped off after three weeks. It fared better on the Top R&B/Hip-Hop Albums chart, where it debuted at number five and stayed on the chart for seven weeks.

Track listing

Notes
 signifies a co-producer

Personnel

 Channel 7 – track 1, 9
 Sean "Diddy" Combs and Soul Diggaz - track 2
 Channel 7 and Yinon Yahel – track 3, 12
 Tricky Stewart and The-Dream – track 4
 Soul Diggaz – track 5
 Young Boyz – track 6
 Mario Winans – track 7, 10, 11, 13
 Danja and The Clutch – track 8
 Philippe-Marc Anquetil and Christopher Lee-Joe – track 14
 Antwan "Amadeus" Thompson – track 15
 Channel 7 and The Fliptones – track 16
 Malay – track 17

Charts

References

2008 debut albums
Albums produced by Danja (record producer)
Albums produced by Tricky Stewart
Bad Boy Records albums
Donnie Klang albums
Albums produced by Sean Combs